The Teufelsmühle is a mountain south of  Loffenau in the Northern Black Forest. It lies between the valleys of the Murg in the west and the Alb in the east. The Alb rises near the eastern flank of the mountain (at the Albursprung), before reaching Bad Herrenalb a few kilometres further north. Over the summit plateau of the Teufelsmühle, which runs in a north-south direction, runs the boundary between the municipalities of Gernsbach in the Murg valley and  Loffenau, both of which belong to the Baden-Württemberg county of Rastatt.

Infrastructure 

In 1910, the Teufelsmühle Tower was erected on the summit plateau, which stood 10 metres high. In 1952 the observation tower was raised to a height of 16.2 metres. In 1958, a building was added that was eventually expanded into a hiker's inn. Not far from the tower stand the Teufelsmühle mountain inn. Together the building and the guest house of Teufelsmühle form a hamlet in the municipality of Loffenau. It is accessible by motor vehicles on a minor road from Rißwasen. The mountain is a base for walks and mountain bike tours. The landing zone is 550 metres below at Loffenau.

On the Teufelsmühle Tower is a plaque with a picture of Hubertus Waldteufel, a local poet, whose real name was Emil Dietz and who lived from 1879 to 1957, ending his days in Bad Herrenalb-Zieflensberg. The Waldteufel Way (Waldteufelweg) in Upper Gaistal is named after him.

Name 
The Teufelsmühle does not get its name (which means "Devil's Mill") from an actual mill, but a popular interpretation of the glacial stone run found here. In the absence of a nearby rock massif and without knowing about the transportation of large boulders by prehistoric glaciers, the existence of large boulders is difficult to explain. So according to legend the scattered boulders were blocks from a former mill built by the devil.

References

External links 

 
 Description of the hiking trail to the Teufelsmühle on the  official website of Bad Herrenalb
 Description of the path to the Teufelsmühle 
 History and description of the Teufelsmühle with zoomable panoramic photograph.

Mountains under 1000 metres
Mountains and hills of Baden-Württemberg
Mountains and hills of the Black Forest
Rastatt (district)